Deadlines is a 2004 French / British / Tunisian action film directed by Ludi Boeken and Michael Alan Lerner.

Cast 
 Stephen Moyer – Alex Randal
 Anne Parillaud – Julia Muller
 Omid Djalili – Abdul Sayyaf
 Georges Siatidis – Yann Meschen
 Ibrahim Zarrouk – Ali
 Larry Lamb – Paul Baker
 Lotfi Dziri – Rahman

References

External links 

2004 action films
Tunisian drama films
2004 films
French action films
British action films
2000s English-language films
2000s British films
2000s French films